Sanda Min Hla Mwei It (1340s– 1365) was a principal queen consort of King Binnya U of Martaban–Hanthawaddy. She may have been Binnya U's first chief queen consort.

Brief
Born Mwei It, the future queen was the eldest daughter of Minister Than-Bon of the Martaban court. She and her two younger sisters Mwei Kaw and Mwei Zeik became queens of Binnya U soon after his accession. Their youngest sister Mwei Daw later became a wife of Binnya U about five years later. She may have been the king's first chief queen consort.

The queen did not have any issue. She raised her nephew Ma Nyi Kan-Kaung (son of Mwei Daw and Min Linka) as her own son. She died in Donwun in the mid 1360s a few years after Binnya U had been driven out of Martaban by the rebel forces led by Byattaba. Her request to Binnya U on her death bed was not to harm Nyi Kan-Kaung; she died soon after the king agreed to her wish. The king kept his promise. In the early 1370s, the king appointed Nyi Kan-Kaung, who was also his nephew, governor of Dala–Twante.

Notes

References

Bibliography
 

Chief queens consort of Hanthawaddy
1360s deaths
Burmese people of Mon descent
14th-century Burmese women